Ni Luh is an Indonesian television Investigation news program that broadcasts on Kompas TV. On October 17, 2022, it aired its first episode, Siasat Sambo Lolos Eksekusi Mati. The program is a sequel from Aiman after Aiman Witjaksono resigned from Kompas TV. It selects news from throughout the week to be aired more fully and deeply through the program airing Monday.

References

External links 

 

Indonesian television news shows
Indonesian-language television shows
2022 Indonesian television series debuts
2020s Indonesian television series
Kompas TV original programming